Alisha Rules the World is the debut album by English pop duo Alisha's Attic, released on 4 November 1996. The album received positive reviews, and went platinum in the following year, selling 400,000 copies in the UK (with another 100,000 in Japan). The four singles released from the album all reached the top 20 of the UK Singles Chart.

Track listing
All tracks composed by Karen Poole, Shelly Poole and Terry Martin.
"Irresistible U Are" – 1:49
"Intense" – 3:55
"I Am, I Feel" – 4:00
"Alisha Rules the World" – 4:34
"White Room" – 4:13
"Stone in My Shoe" – 4:39
"Personality Lines" – 0:54
"Indestructible" – 3:39
"I Won't Miss You" – 4:01
"The Golden Rule" – 1:34
"Just the Way You Like It" – 3:57
"Air We Breathe" – 4:37
"Adore U" – 3:57

Note: "Indestructible" was consistently misspelt as "Indestructable" on CD and printed covers as was "Irresistible" misspelt as "Irresistable".

Personnel
Alisha's Attic
Karen Poole – vocals
Shelly Poole – vocals
with:
Dave Stewart – "all guitars and fairy dust"
Chucho Merchán – bass, double bass
Terry Disley – keyboards
Andy Wright, Garry Hughes, Paul Taylor – keyboards, programming
Kat Evans – electric violin
Olle Romo – additional programming on "Air We Breathe"
Caroline Dale – cello on "Air We Breathe"
Fenella Barton, Thomas Bowes – violin on "Air We Breathe"
Andrew Brown – viola on "Air We Breathe"

Charts

Weekly charts

Year-end charts

Certifications

References

External links

1996 debut albums
Alisha's Attic albums
Albums produced by David A. Stewart
Mercury Records albums
Albums recorded at The Church Studios